Pachliopta leytensis is a species of butterfly from the family Papilionidae that is found in the Philippines.

The larvae feed on Aristolochia philippensis.

References

Page M. G. & Treadaway, C. G.  2003 Schmetterlinge der Erde, Butterflies of the world Part XVII (17), Papilionidae IX Papilionidae of the Philippine Islands. Edited by Erich Bauer and  Thomas Frankenbach  Keltern : Goecke & Evers ; Canterbury : Hillside Books. 

Pachliopta
Atrophaneura
Butterflies described in 1978